The American Rivers Conference men's basketball tournament is the annual conference basketball championship tournament for the NCAA Division III American Rivers Conference. It is a single-elimination tournament and seeding is based on regular season records.

The tournament was previously known as the Iowa Intercollegiate Athletic Conference men's basketball tournament, changing its name with the league in 2018–19.

As conference champion, the winner receives the ARC's automatic bid to the NCAA Men's Division III Basketball Championship.

Buena Vista are the most successful team, with 7 titles.

Results
 Record incomplete prior to 1999

Championship records
Results incomplete before 1999

 Schools highlighted in pink are former members of the ARC/IIAC

References

NCAA Division III men's basketball conference tournaments
Tournament